Mario Ustolin (4 April 1924 – 30 December 2006) was an Italian rower. He competed at the 1948 Summer Olympics in London with the men's double sculls where they were eliminated in the semi-final.

References

External links
 

1924 births
2006 deaths
Italian male rowers
Olympic rowers of Italy
Rowers at the 1948 Summer Olympics
Sportspeople from Trieste
European Rowing Championships medalists